Tom Mackintosh (born 30 January 1997) is a New Zealand rower. He won gold in the men's eight event at the 2020 Summer Olympics.

References

External links
 

1997 births
Living people
New Zealand male rowers
Olympic rowers of New Zealand
Rowers at the 2020 Summer Olympics
Rowers from Wellington City
Olympic gold medalists for New Zealand in rowing
Medalists at the 2020 Summer Olympics